Caroline Maes (born 9 November 1982) is a former Belgian tennis player.

Maes has been active in the singles game since 1997 and doubles since 1999. The highest place she ever achieved in the WTA rankings in singles is 151st on 28 May 2007. In doubles, she got to the No. 135, on 11 February 2008. She could not win a WTA tournament, but won eight  tournaments in singles and nine in doubles on the ITF Women's Circuit. Her last and most important ITF title was the $100k tournament in Rome, on 19 May 2007, defeating Yuliya Beygelzimer and Stéphanie Cohen-Aloro on her way to the final, where she beat former top-50 player Marta Marrero from Spain. She performed three top-100 wins: against Yuliana Fedak (world No. 66, Hasselt 2006), Jelena Kostanić (No. 46, Dubai 2006), Akiko Morigami (No. 51, Strasbourg 2007). In 2006, she also made it to the round of the last 16 in doubles at the Miami Open, together with Kim Clijsters.

Fed Cup
Maes was a member of the Belgium Fed Cup team in 2002, 2003, 2004, 2006 and 2007. She had three appearances in singles and four in doubles. However, she did not win any singles match and won only one doubles match, partnering Els Callens against the Slovakia Fed Cup team.

She is very close friends with Kim Clijsters. She made herself unavailable for selection in Fed Cup tie against China in 2007, because she wished to attend the wedding of Clijsters and American basketball player Brian Lynch that week-end (14 July 2007) instead.

ITF Circuit finals

Singles: 11 (8–3)

Doubles: 19 (9–10)

External links
 
 
 Official fansite

1982 births
Living people
Belgian female tennis players
Sportspeople from East Flanders
People from Dendermonde
People from Zele
21st-century Belgian women